German submarine U-47 was a Type VIIB U-boat of Nazi Germany's Kriegsmarine during World War II. She was laid down on 25 February 1937 at Friedrich Krupp Germaniawerft in Kiel as yard number 582 and went into service on 17 December 1938 under the command of Günther Prien.

During U-47s career, she sank a total of 31 enemy vessels, including the British battleship , and damaged nine more. U-47 ranks as one of the most successful German U-boats of World War II.

In 2016, one of the faulty torpedoes shot at HMS Royal Oak was found and identified.

Design
German Type VIIB submarines were preceded by the shorter Type VIIA submarines. U-47 had a displacement of  when at the surface and  while submerged. She had two shafts and two  propellers.

U-47 was fitted with five  torpedo tubes (four fitted at the bow and one at the stern), fourteen torpedoes, one  SK C/35 naval gun, 220 rounds, and one  C/30 anti-aircraft gun. The boat had a complement of between forty-four and sixty.

Service history

U-47 carried out ten combat patrols and spent a total of 238 days at sea. She sank 31 enemy ships (totalling 162,769 GRT and 29,150 tons) and damaged eight more. Prior to her disappearance in March 1941, U-47 lost one crewman, Heinrich Mantyk, who fell overboard on 5 September 1940.

First patrol
U-47 was assigned to the 7th U-boat Flotilla on 17 December 1938, (the day she was commissioned). She was an operational boat in the 7th Flotilla for her entire career. U-47 was sent to sea in a pre-emptive move before war broke out in September 1939; this move would enable her to engage enemy vessels as soon as the war began. She left for her first war patrol on 19 August 1939 (two weeks before the commencement of hostilities), from the port of Kiel. During her first patrol, she circumnavigated the British Isles and entered the Bay of Biscay to commence patrol of Area I.  On 3 September, war was declared and U-47 received orders to initiate hostilities against British ships, but none were encountered on the first day. The first ship encountered by U-47 during the war was a neutral Greek freighter which Prien inspected but released unharmed. Two further neutral vessels were encountered and Prien declined to even stop them.

Just after dawn on 5 September, Engelbert Endrass – serving as first watch officer aboard U-47 – spotted SS Bosnia zigzagging and in a darkened state.  Prien surfaced and fired a single shot from his 88 mm deck gun to stop the ship but instead Bosnia made steam and began radioing an alert ('SSS') along with its name and position.  Prien then immediately fired an additional four rounds of which three hit the ship, prompting its crew to abandon ship.  U-47 rendered assistance to the crew of Bosnia, bringing them aboard the submarine and helping to set up a lifeboat which had capsized during the crew's escape.  A Norwegian vessel also arrived and took all of the survivors aboard.  Following its departure, Prien fired a single torpedo which wrecked the ship which sank with its load of sulfur almost immediately.  The 2,407 GRT Bosnia became the second British vessel, and first freighter, sunk after Athenia.

It was later the next day during which U-47 encountered a larger British freighter, the 4,086 GRT SS Rio Carlo.  Again, Prien opted to surface and initiate a gun attack on the merchant.  While the Rio Carlo did stop moving, it nonetheless broadcast the submarine alert, prompting Prien to fire an ineffective warning shot.  A further three shots from the deck gun onto the bridge of Rio Carlo, upon which the broadcast ceased and the crew abandoned ship.  Once the crew was away, Prien finished the vessel and sent its mixed cargo to the bottom with a single torpedo.  While U-47s crew was inspecting the lifeboats and ensuring the survivors had provisions, an aircraft appeared and U-47 dived, departing the area and leaving the crew to others to rescue.

On 7 September, Prien encountered yet another British freighter, and once again initiated a surface attack on it.  Attempting to escape, SS Gartavon broadcast the submarine alert, drawing fire from the deck gun.  The mast and radio antenna were destroyed by the fire and the ship came about while the crew put to in a lifeboat.  Surprising Prien, the Gartavon crew had rigged the ship to get underway in an attempt to ram the attacking submarine.  It began to make steam after its crew departed and Prien was forced to take emergency measures to avoid the vessel.  After avoiding the abandoned Gartavon, Prien inspected the lifeboat and after its crew declined the offer to fetch a second lifeboat from the circling freighter, he left them. (All survived.) Prien refused to radio for assistance on account of the attempt to ram him. He returned to Gartavon and attempted to finish her as he had his previous victims, but the torpedo malfunctioned and Prien instead used the deck gun to wreck the ship and sink its cargo of iron ore.

During this first patrol, which ended with her arrival in Kiel on 15 September 1939, three vessels were sunk for a total of 8,270 GRT.

Sinking of HMS Royal Oak

On 8 October 1939, U-47 began her second patrol. On 14 October 1939 (six days after leaving port), she succeeded in penetrating the Royal Navy's primary base at Scapa Flow.
Although most of the Home Fleet was not at the base at the time, U-47 managed to find a target, the battleship . Once she had spotted Royal Oak, she opened fire with her torpedoes. Her first two salvos did nothing more than sever an anchor chain. After reloading the bow tubes the last salvo of three torpedoes struck the British warship, causing severe flooding. Taking on a list of 15 degrees, her open portholes were submerged, worsening the flooding and increasing the list to 45 degrees; Royal Oak sank within 15 minutes with the loss of over 800 men. Following the attack, Prien received the nickname Der Stier von Scapa Flow ("The Bull of Scapa Flow"); the emblem of a snorting bull was then painted on the conning tower of U-47 and the image soon became the emblem of the entire 7th U-boat Flotilla. Prien was awarded the Knight's Cross of the Iron Cross, the first sailor of a U-boat and the second member of the Kriegsmarine to receive this decoration. The rest of the crew members were awarded the Iron Cross. Two other U-47 crew members also earned the Knight's Cross later on during World War II: the chief engineer (Leitender Ingenieur) Johann-Friedrich Wessels and 1st watch officer (I. Wachoffizier) Engelbert Endrass.

Many years later, in September 2002, one of the unexploded torpedoes that U-47 had fired during the attack on Royal Oak rose to the surface from its resting place on the bottom. The unexploded torpedo, minus its warhead, gradually drifted towards the shore, where it was spotted by a crewman aboard the Norwegian tanker Petrotrym. A Royal Navy tugboat intercepted the torpedo, and after identifying it as having belonged to U-47 63 years earlier, EOD (explosive ordnance disposal) personnel discarded it a mile from shore.

On 16 April 2016 Royal Navy bomb disposal experts detonated a World War II torpedo found in Scapa Flow.
It is believed to have been one of those fired at Royal Oak by U-47.

Third patrol

Following a lavish celebration in Berlin for the sinking of HMS Royal Oak in which the crew members of U-47 were received by Adolf Hitler and decorated, the boat returned to sea on 16 November 1939. Once the U-boat had left Kiel on 16 November, she headed out into the North Sea. After traveling around the British Isles into the Bay of Biscay and the English Channel, U-47 sank a further three vessels, Navasota on 5 December, the Norwegian steamer MV Britta on 6 December and Tajandoen on 7 December. Following the sinking of Navasota, British destroyers briefly fired depth charges at the U-boat but she managed to safely evade the attack without any damage.

Fourth patrol
U-47 left the port of Wilhelmshaven and began her fourth patrol on 11 March 1940. For 19 days, she roamed the North Sea in search of any Allied convoys. However, she only managed to torpedo the Danish steam merchantman Britta north of Scotland on 25 March. Following the sinking of Britta, U-47 returned to Wilhelmshaven on 29 March.

Fifth patrol
U-47s fifth patrol was her first one that resulted in no ships sunk. She left Wilhelmshaven on 3 April 1940, and headed once again out into the North Sea. While she did not sink any Allied vessels on her fifth patrol, around 19 April, she fired a torpedo aimed at the British battleship  but the torpedo missed its target or failed to detonate upon impact. Several nearby destroyers attempted to sink the U-boat using depth charges but U-47 managed to escape.

Sixth patrol
U-47s sixth patrol was much more successful. Having left Kiel on 3 June 1940, she ventured out into the North Sea and operated off the southern coast of Ireland. Along with six other U-boats in Wolfpack Prien, she attacked Convoy HX 47 and the first ship to fall victim to the U-boat was the British SS Balmoralwood; which was sunk on 14 June. The German submarine returned to Kiel on 6 July after 34 days at sea and eight enemy vessels sunk.

Seventh patrol
U-47s seventh patrol consisted of her travelling north of the British Isles and into the North Atlantic, south of Iceland. During a period of 30 days, she sank a total of six enemy vessels and damaged another. U-47s first victory during her seventh patrol was the sinking of the Belgian passenger ship Ville de Mons on 2 September 1940. This was followed by the sinking of a British vessel, Titan, on 4 September and Gro, José de Larrinaga, and Neptunian on the 7th. On the 9th, U-47 sank the Greek merchant ship Possidon, and on 21 September she damaged the British merchant ship Elmbank. Following these victories, on the 25th, U-47 entered the French port of Lorient, which was now under German control following the decisive Battle of France.

Eighth patrol
U-47s eighth patrol began on 14 October 1940 when she left her home port of Lorient. While her eighth patrol lasted ten days, she sank four enemy vessels and damaged a further two in only two days. On 19 October, U-47 damaged the British vessel Shirak and sank Uganda and Wandby, both of which were British registered. The next day, the U-boat damaged the British vessel Athelmonarch and sank La Estancia as well as Whitford Point. She returned to port three days later on the 23rd.

Ninth patrol
U-47 left her home port of Lorient on 3 November 1940 and moved out into the North Atlantic in search of Allied convoys. During her ninth patrol, she damaged three ships, Gonçalo Velho, Conch and Dunsley, and sank Ville d´Arlon. U-47 returned to Lorient for the last time on 6 December. On her return Kretschmer presented a lifebelt from Conch which U-47 had damaged to Adolph Hitler.

Disappearance
U-47 departed Lorient on her tenth and last patrol on 20 February 1941. HMS Wolverine had made an earlier attack on a submarine at 0510hrs, 5 minutes after U-47'''s last known torpedo attack on the Whale Factory ship Terje Viken. Nothing further was heard from U-47 after this time. U-47 had a crew of 45 officers and men during her last North Atlantic patrol in early 1941, all of whom were presumed to have died.

WolfpacksU-47 took part in one wolfpack, namely:
 Prien (12 – 17 June 1940)

Summary of raiding history

During her service in the Kriegsmarine, U-47 sank 30 commercial ships totalling  and one warship of 29,150 tons; she also damaged eight commercial ships totalling  and one warship of 10,035 tons.

See also
 U 47 – Kapitänleutnant Prien, a 1958 film about Prien's command of U-47''
 List of most successful German U-boats

References

Notes

Citations

Bibliography

External links
 u47.org

 "The Bull of Scapa Flow" Detailed article on the Scapa Flow mission. Includes photos, video, maps, quotes, sources

1938 ships
German Type VIIB submarines
Missing U-boats of World War II
Ships built in Kiel
U-boats commissioned in 1938
U-boats sunk in 1941
U-boats sunk by unknown causes
World War II shipwrecks in the Atlantic Ocean
World War II submarines of Germany
Maritime incidents in March 1941